Yihun Endashew Zewide (born 5 November 1992) is an Ethiopian footballer who plays for Ethiopian Premier League club Fasil Kenema as a defensive midfielder.

Career
Endashew has played for Dire Dawa City, Jimma Aba Jifar, Hadiya Hossana and Fasil Kenema.

He made his international debut for Ethiopia in 2015.

References

1992 births
Living people
Ethiopian footballers
Ethiopia international footballers
Dire Dawa City S.C. players
Jimma Aba Jifar F.C. players
Hadiya Hossana F.C. players
Fasil Kenema S.C. players
Association football midfielders
2021 Africa Cup of Nations players
2022 African Nations Championship players
Ethiopia A' international footballers